Mount Cromie is a snow-covered mountain,  high, rising  southeast of Mount Boyd in the Bush Mountains. It was discovered and photographed by the United States Antarctic Service, 1939–41. It was surveyed by A.P. Crary, leader of the U.S. Ross Ice Shelf Traverse Party (1957–58), and named by him for William Cromie, assistant glaciologist with the party.

References 

Mountains of the Ross Dependency
Dufek Coast